The Bonifacio Capital District (BCD) is a financial district in Metro Manila, Philippines under the joint management of Megaworld Corporation and the Bases Conversion and Development Authority. It covers the southern area of Fort Bonifacio with the Bonifacio Global City district situated north of the BCD. Makati also claims jurisdiction of the area as part of its Post Proper Southside barangay.

History
The Bonifacio Capital District (BCD) was created as a joint venture between the private conglomerate Megaworld Corporation with the Bases Conversion and Development Authority (BCDA) of the Philippine national government both of which will manage the area. A memorandum of agreement was signed on March 14, 2019 regarding their plans for the BCD. 

The areas placed under the BCD upon its creation were: Megaworld's McKinley Hill and McKinley West developments, BCDA's Philippine Navy Village as well as Bonifacio South Pointe, which is a joint venture with the SM Group and BCDA-owned Consular property beside McKinley West, and a one hectare lot. The BCD is also meant to be "country's administrative capital" with the Senate of the Philippines, the Supreme Court, and the Court of Appeals planning to move to the financial district. The development is projected to complete in 10 years.

See also
Makati–Taguig–Pateros boundary dispute

References

Taguig
Makati
Districts in Metro Manila